Captain Heidi Michels Blanck is an American public health epidemiologist, nutrition and obesity researcher, and officer of the US Public Health Service Commissioned Corps. Blanck is currently chief of the Obesity Prevention and Control Branch at the Centers for Disease Control and Prevention (CDC) and a senior advisor at the CDC.

Blanck received a PhD in Nutrition and Health Sciences from Emory University, and holds an adjunct professor position there. Blanck is a member of the National Academy of Sciences and is also on the editorial board of the medical journal Childhood Obesity.

References

External links 

 Publications of Heidi Blanck at PubMed
 Publications of Heidi Blanck at ResearchGate

Living people
Year of birth missing (living people)
American women epidemiologists
American epidemiologists
United States Public Health Service Commissioned Corps officers
United States Public Health Service personnel
Emory University alumni
Emory University faculty
Centers for Disease Control and Prevention people
American medical researchers
American women academics
21st-century American women